Cristiano Pereira de Souza (born 28 July 1977), also known as Brasília, is a Brazilian former professional footballer who played as a forward. His previous clubs include Odra Wodzisław Śląski, Wisła Kraków, Pogoń Szczecin, Zagłębie Lubin in Poland, Belenenses, Leixões, Vitória SC in Portugal, Energie Cottbus in Germany and Olympiakos Nicosia in Cyprus.

In the 2008 season, he moved to Ulsan Hyundai Horang-i.

In 2008, he won South Korea's K-League and was top assistor with six assists. He joined Pohang Steelers in January 2009 and scored nine goals in nine games.

In January 2010, he joined Ekstraklasa club Odra Wodzislaw.

Honours
Wisła Kraków
 Ekstraklasa: 2003–04

Jeonbuk Hyundai Motors
 K League: 2009

References

External links
  
 

1977 births
Living people
Footballers from Brasília
Association football forwards
Brazilian footballers
Brazilian expatriate footballers
Ituano FC players
Wisła Kraków players
Pogoń Szczecin players
FC Energie Cottbus players
Zagłębie Lubin players
C.F. Os Belenenses players
Sport Club do Recife players
Leixões S.C. players
Vitória S.C. players
Daejeon Hana Citizen FC players
Ulsan Hyundai FC players
Pohang Steelers players
Jeonbuk Hyundai Motors players
Odra Wodzisław Śląski players
Olympiakos Nicosia players
Uberaba Sport Club players
Esporte Clube Santo André players
Boa Esporte Clube players
Uberlândia Esporte Clube players
Esporte Clube São Bento players
Clube de Regatas Brasil players
Ekstraklasa players
Bundesliga players
Primeira Liga players
K League 1 players
Cypriot First Division players
Expatriate footballers in Poland
Expatriate footballers in Germany
Expatriate footballers in Portugal
Expatriate footballers in South Korea
Expatriate footballers in Cyprus
Brazilian expatriate sportspeople in Poland
Brazilian expatriate sportspeople in Germany
Brazilian expatriate sportspeople in Portugal
Brazilian expatriate sportspeople in South Korea
Murici Futebol Clube players